Uri Shulevitz (born February 27, 1935) is an American writer and illustrator of children's books. He won the 1969 Caldecott Medal for U.S. picture book illustration, recognizing The Fool of the World and the Flying Ship, a Russian fairy tale retold by Arthur Ransome in 1916.

Biography
Uri Shulevitz was born in Warsaw, Poland, on February 27, 1935. During the bombing of Warsaw in 1939, a bomb fell into a stairwell of his apartment building when he was at home. The family fled from Poland and settled in Paris by 1947, then moved again to Israel in 1949.  During the Sinai War in 1956, Mr. Shulevitz joined the Israeli Army. Later, he joined the Ein Gedi kibbutz.

Shulevitz moved to New York City in 1959, studying painting at Brooklyn Museum Art School and working as an illustrator for a Hebrew children's book publisher. In 1962, an editor at Harper & Row saw his freelance portfolio and suggested he write children's books. He created his first picture book, The Moon in My Room, in 1963.

Shulevitz lives in New York City. Despite having the same name, Uri Shulevitz is not directly related to noted independent filmmaker Robert Shulevitz.

Works

The Moon in My Room (1963)
The Mystery of the Woods (1964) (written by Mary Stolz)
A Rose, a Bridge, and a Wild Black Horse (1964) (written by Charlotte Zolotow)
The Second Witch (1965) (written by Jack Sendak)
The Twelve Dancing Princesses (1966) (Brothers Grimm tale adapted by Elizabeth Shub)
The Carpet of Solomon (1966) (written by Sulamith Ish-Kishor)
The Month Brothers (1967) (written by Dorothy Nathan)
Runaway Jonah, and other tales (1967) (written by Jan Wahl)
One Monday Morning (1967)
The Silkspinners (1967) (written by Jean Russell Larson)
My Kind of Verse (1968) (edited by John Smith)
The Fool of the World and the Flying Ship (book) (1969) (written by Arthur Ransome)
Rain Rain Rivers (1969)
The Wonderful Kite (1970) (written by Jan Wahl)
Oh What a Noise! (1971) (written by William Brighty Rands)
Soldier and Tsar in the Forest (1972) (written by A N Afanasʹev)
The Magician (1973) (adapted from the Yiddish of Isaac Leib Peretz)
The Fools of Chelm and Their History (1973) (written by Isaac Bashevis Singer)
Dawn (1974)
The Touchstone (1976) (written by Robert Louis Stevenson)
The Treasure (1978)
Hanukah Money (1978) (written by Sholem Aleichem)
The Lost Kingdom of Karnica (1979) (written by Richard Kennedy) 
The Golem (1982) (written by Isaac Bashevis Singer)
Writing With Pictures (1985)
The Strange and Exciting Adventures of Jeremiah Hush (1986)
Toddlecreek Post Office (1990)
The Diamond Tree (1991) (written by Howard Schwartz and Barbara Rush)
The Secret Room (1993)
The Golden Goose (1995) (adapted from the Brothers Grimm)
Hosni the Dreamer (1997) (written by Ehud Ben-ʻEzer)
Snow (1998)
What Is a Wise Bird Like You Doing in a Silly Tale Like This (2000)
Daughters of Fire (2001) (written by Fran Manushkin)
The Travels of Benjamin of Tudela (2005)
SoSleepyStory (2006)
How I Learned Geography (2008)
When I Wore My sailor Suit (2009)
Dusk (2013)
Troto and the Trucks (2015)

Chance (2020)

Awards
1969: Caldecott Medal, The Fool of the World and the Flying Ship
1979: Caldecott Honor, The Treasure
1998: Charlotte Zolotow Award, Snow
1998: Golden Kite Award, Picture Book Illustration, Snow
1999: Caldecott Honor, Snow
2005: National Jewish Book Award in the Illustrated Children's Book category for The Travels of Benjamin of Tudela
2009: Caldecott Honor, How I Learned Geography

References

External links 
 
 Uri Shulevitz profile at publisher Macmillan US
 

1935 births
American children's writers
Caldecott Medal winners
American children's book illustrators
Israeli soldiers
Jewish American artists
Polish emigrants to the United States
Polish emigrants to Israel
Living people
21st-century American Jews